Events from the year 1868 in Denmark.

Incumbents
 Monarch – Christian IX
 Prime minister – C. E. Frijs

Events
 24 April – The Port of Esbjerg construction act provides for the construction of a new export port at Esbjerg, until then a tiny community, as a replacement for the harbour in Altona, which had previously been Denmark's most important North Sea harbour.
 7 August – The Roman Catholic Diocese of Copenhagen is established.
 16 October – All Danish rights to the Nicobar Islands, which since 1848 had been gradually abandoned, are sold to the British as the last remains of Danish India.

Undated 

 Magasin du Nord is established in Aarhus as Emil Vett & Co. by Theodor Wessel and Emil Vett.

Births
 13 May – Peter Hansen, painter (d. 1928)
 25 April – Carl Wentorf, artist (d. 1914)
 26 May – Carl Johan Bonnesen, sculptor (d. 1933)
 25 October – Rasmus Harboe, sculptor (d. 1952)

Deaths
 15 January – Christopher Bagnæs Hansen, furniture maker (b. 1806)
 14 February – Emil Bærentzen, painter (b. 1799)
 10 March
 Herman Wilhelm Bissen, sculptor (b. 1798)
 Bernt Wilhelm Westermann, businessman (b. 1781)

References

 
1860s in Denmark
Denmark
Years of the 19th century in Denmark